A glass cone is a glass production structure historically unique to the United Kingdom. A glass cone had a large central furnace, a circular platform where the glassblowers worked, and smaller furnaces around its wall to ensure the glass did not cool too quickly.

There are four surviving glass cones:
 Catcliffe Glass Cone, South Yorkshire
 Lemington Glass Works, Newcastle upon Tyne
 Northern Glass Cone, Alloa Glass Works, a Scottish scheduled monument,
 Red House Cone in Wordsley, granted listed building status in 1966

See also
 Bottle oven, a bottle-shaped kiln typical of Stoke-on-Trent

References

Glass production
Industrial processes